= Chuck Warp =

Italian electronic dance music producer, DJ, songwriter and pianist

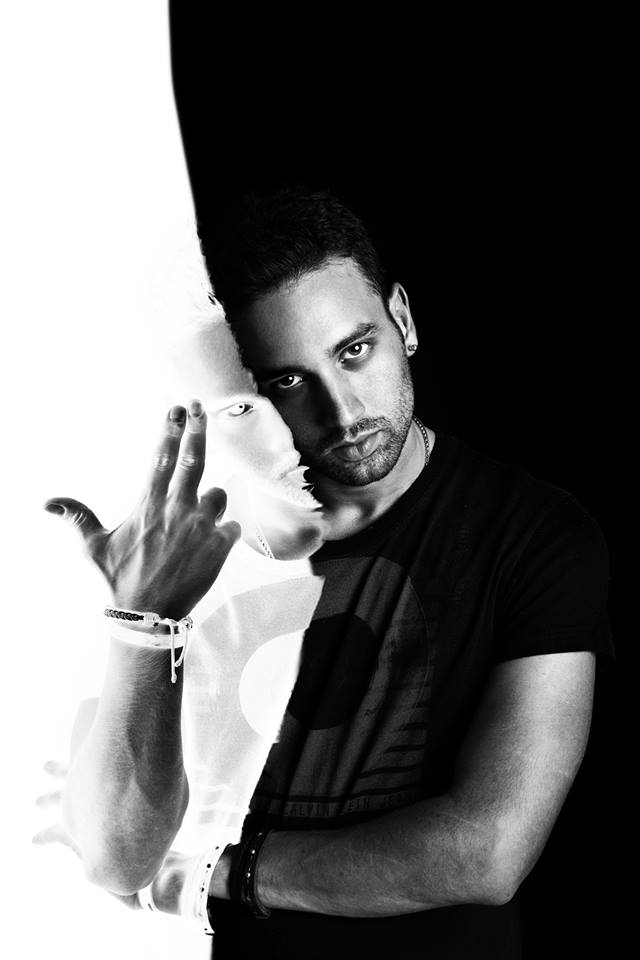

Background information
- Born: 08/09/1990
- Genres: Trap, Electronic dance music, hip hop
- Website: chuckwarp.com

Francesco Murgia (born August 9, 1990), known professionally as Chuck Warp, is an Italian electronic dance music producer, DJ, songwriter and pianist. Best known for the single Ho preso il fumo, best parody music of summer 2016 as voted by Rolling Stone Italia.

== Discography ==
=== Singles ===
- 2016: Ho preso il fumo
- 2017: Bordello
- 2017: Keep the Beat
- 2017: Zingaro
